There have been 38 women in the Tasmanian House of Assembly since its establishment in 1856. Women have had the right to vote since 1903 and the right to stand as candidates since 1921.

The first successful female candidates for the House of Assembly were Amelia Best and Mabel Miller, both Liberals, who were elected in 1955. In 1962, Miller (Best had lost election twice, in 1956 and 1959) was joined by the first Labor woman, Lynda Heaven. In 1964, both Miller and Heaven left the House, and women were not represented again until 1976, when Labor's Gill James was elected. Since then women have been continuously represented in the House.

Christine Milne and Di Hollister were the first women elected to represent the Greens in 1989. Kristie Johnston was the first independent woman elected in 2021, although Mary Willey, Madeleine Ogilvie and Sue Hickey had served as independents after leaving their parties. Kathryn Hay was the first Indigenous woman elected to the Tasmanian parliament in 2002.

Lara Giddings became the first female Premier of Tasmania on 24 January 2011.

With the re-election of Madeleine Ogilvie on 11 September 2019, the House of Assembly became Australia's first state to elect a majority of women members in one house, with 13 of the 25 members being female.

List of women in the Tasmanian House of Assembly

Names in bold indicate women who have been appointed as Ministers and Parliamentary Secretaries during their time in Parliament. Names in italics indicate women who were first elected at a recount, and * symbolises members that have sat as members in both the Legislative Assembly and the Legislative Council.

Timeline

References

 
 
Tasmania